The Hall River is a river on the West Coast of New Zealand. It drains Lake Paringa, flowing north to the Paringa River, which drains into the Tasman Sea.

See also
List of rivers of New Zealand

References

Land Information New Zealand - Search for Place Names

Westland District
Rivers of the West Coast, New Zealand
Rivers of New Zealand